Kenimekh district is a district of Navoiy Region in Uzbekistan. The capital lies at the town Kenimekh. The district consists of 5 urban-type settlements (Kenimekh, Balaqaraq, Mamiqchi, Shoʻrtepa, Zafarobod) and 7 rural communities. Until 2018, when it became part of Kenimekh district, the town Zafarobod was part of the Gʻijduvon District (Bukhara Region).

References

Navoiy Region
Districts of Uzbekistan